The Woman Juror is a 1926 British silent era drama film directed by Milton Rosmer and starring Charles Ashton, Alexander Field and Frank Vosper. It was adapted from a play of the same name by E.F. Parr.

Cast
Bell - 	Alexander Field
Jenefer Canynge - 	Gladys Jennings
Morgan - 	Frank Vosper
Michael - 	John Stuart
Casey - 	 Charles Ashton

References

1926 films
British silent short films
1926 drama films
Films directed by Milton Rosmer
British drama films
British black-and-white films
1920s British films
Silent drama films